Jacob Kuwinsuk Gale was a South Sudanese politician and member of the Transitional National Legislative Assembly of South Sudan for Yei River State, who was killed in northern Uganda on December 6, 2017. No rebel group claimed responsibility for the murder.

References 

20th-century births
2017 deaths
South Sudanese politicians
Members of the National Legislative Assembly (South Sudan)
People from Central Equatoria
Year of birth missing
People murdered in Uganda
Northern Region, Uganda